Andrew Clarke may refer to:

Andrew Clarke (British Army officer, born 1793) (1793–1847), Governor of Western Australia
Sir Andrew Clarke (British Army officer, born 1824) (1824–1902), Governor of the Straits Settlements, son of the above
Andrew Clarke (actor) (born 1954), Australian actor
Andrew Clarke (British politician) (1868–1940), Labour Member of Parliament 1923–1924, and 1929
Andrew Clarke (cricketer, born 1961), English former cricketer
Andrew Clarke (cricketer, born 1975), English cricketer
Andrew Clarke (Trinidadian cricketer) (born 1945), Trinidadian cricketer
Andy Clarke (footballer) (born 1967), English former footballer
Andy Clarke (businessman) (born 1964), British businessman
Andy Clarke (comics), British comics artist
Andy C (Andrew Clarke, born 1973), English DJ
Andrew Clarke, a fictional character from The Breakfast Club
Andrew Clarke, Australian composer who collaborates with artist Jess Johnson

See also
Andrew Clark (disambiguation)